Delniţa may refer to several villages in Romania:

 Delniţa, a village in Păuleni-Ciuc Commune, Harghita County
 Delniţa, a village in Fundu Moldovei Commune, Suceava County

See also 
 Delnița River (disambiguation)